The Roman Catholic Diocese of Zhoucun/Chowtsun is a diocese located in Zhoucun (Zibo) in the Ecclesiastical province of Jinan in China.

History
 April 16, 1929: Established as Mission “sui iuris” of Zhangdian 張店 from the Apostolic Vicariate of Tsinanfu 濟南府
 June 1, 1932: Promoted as Apostolic Prefecture of Zhangdian 張店
 May 18, 1937: Promoted as Apostolic Vicariate of Zhoucun 周村
 April 11, 1946: Promoted as Diocese of Zhoucun 周村

Leadership
 Bishops of Zhoucun 周村 (Roman rite)
 Bishop Joseph Yang Yongqiang (2013–present)
 Bishop Joseph Ma Xue-sheng (1997 - 2013)
 Bishop John Gao Ke-xian (1993 - 2005) (clandestinely)
 Bishop Henry Ambrose Pinger, O.F.M. (April 11, 1946 – September 24, 1988)
 Vicars Apostolic of Zhoucun 周村 (Roman Rite)
 Bishop Henry Ambrose Pinger, O.F.M. (May 18, 1937 – April 11, 1946)
 Prefects Apostolic of Zhangdian 張店 (Roman Rite)
 Fr. Henry Ambrose Pinger, O.F.M. (later Bishop) (1932 – May 18, 1937)
 Ecclesiastical Superiors of Zhangdian 張店 (Roman Rite)
 Fr. Henry Ambrose Pinger, O.F.M. (later Bishop) (1930–1932)

References

 GCatholic.org
 Catholic Hierarchy

Roman Catholic dioceses in China
Christian organizations established in 1929
Roman Catholic dioceses and prelatures established in the 20th century
Religion in Shandong
Zibo